Fernando Daniel Belluschi (born 10 September 1983) is an Argentine midfielder currently playing for Estudiantes de Río Cuarto.

Club career
Belluschi began playing professionally at Newell's Old Boys in 2002, with whom he won the 2004 Apertura Championship. He moved to River Plate in 2006 and with the departure of Marcelo Gallardo to Paris Saint-Germain following the 2006 Apertura, he was named team captain, a position he would fill for two years. He then joined Olympiacos for reported €6.5 million in early 2008.

On 6 July 2009, Porto purchased Belluschi's playing rights and 50% of his economic rights for €5 million. The other 50% was owned by private investment company Rio Football Services Ltd. He signed a contract until 2013 with a release clause of €30 million.

In 2012, Belluschi was sent on to Genoa under a purchasing option of €3.5 million, or €5 million if the club qualified for the UEFA Europa League. In summer 2012, Porto sold its 50% ownership of his economic rights for €1.05 million.

On 10 July 2015, Cruz Azul signed Belluschi on a free transfer. His salary was set at €1.1 million. He debuted for the side as a substitute in the 61st minute for an injured Marc Crosas in the Clasico Joven. He did not receive his international pass until the Clasico Joven, which was why he did not participate in any league matches up to that point. He failed to score for Cruz Azul, having a penalty saved by Atlas goalkeeper Miguel Ángel Fraga on matchday 11.

On 26 January 2016, San Lorenzo signed the then-32-year-old Belluschi on a free transfer.

Career statistics

International career 
Belluschi has won six caps for Argentina, all in friendlies. In November 2017, after six years away from the national team, Belluschi was named in coach Jorge Sampaoli's squad for friendlies against Russia and Nigeria in the former.

Personal life
Belluschi is married to Florencia, whom he met in his home city of Los Quirquinchos. They began dating when he was 17 years old and have been together since. He is best friends with fellow professional footballer Ignacio Scocco, and both served as best men at each other's wedding.

Belluschi also holds an Italian passport due to his Italian ancestry from the province of Pavia, where his paternal great-grandfather emigrated to Argentina from.

Honours
Newell's Old Boys
Argentine Primera División:  Torneo Apertura 2004

Olympiacos
Superleague Greece:  2007–08, 2008–09
Greek Cup: 2007–08, 2008–09

Porto
Primeira Liga: 2010–11, 2011–12
Taça de Portugal: 2009–10, 2010–11
Supertaça Cândido de Oliveira: 2009, 2010, 2011
UEFA Europa League: 2010–11

San Lorenzo
Supercopa Argentina: 2015
Argentina
South American Youth Championship: 2003
Individual
Footballer of the Year of Argentina: 2016

References

External links 
 
 
 Player Profile on the River Plate Website 
 Argentine Primera statistics at Fútbol XXI 

1983 births
Living people
Argentine people of Arbëreshë descent
Argentine footballers
Argentine expatriate footballers
Argentina international footballers
Association football midfielders
People from Caseros Department
Sportspeople from Santa Fe Province
UEFA Europa League winning players
Newell's Old Boys footballers
Club Atlético River Plate footballers
Olympiacos F.C. players
FC Porto players
Genoa C.F.C. players
Bursaspor footballers
San Lorenzo de Almagro footballers
Club Atlético Lanús footballers
Estudiantes de Río Cuarto footballers
Argentine Primera División players
Super League Greece players
Primeira Liga players
Serie A players
Süper Lig players
Argentine expatriate sportspeople in Greece
Argentine expatriate sportspeople in Portugal
Argentine expatriate sportspeople in Italy
Argentine expatriate sportspeople in Turkey
Expatriate footballers in Greece
Expatriate footballers in Portugal
Expatriate footballers in Italy
Expatriate footballers in Turkey